Rajeev Ranjan Nag is a senior Indian journalist. In October 2014, he was appointed as a Member of the 12th term of the Press Council of India for a three-year term. He was formerly a member of the 11th term of the Press Council. Nag is the author of a book on news reporting called Theory and Practice of Reporting. He has also written a book in Hindi about former Indian Prime Minister Indira Gandhi called Indira Gandhi ka sach.

Paid news
In January 2013, a Press Council of India committee headed by Nag detected evidence of paid news in the 2012 Gujarat elections. The committee published a report giving recommendations on how to curb the practice of paid news.

Press freedom
In July 2013, a Press Council of India committee headed by Nag published a highly critical report accusing the Bihar state government of muzzling the press. In September 2014, a three-member committee of the Press Council headed by Nag held an inquiry against Telangana Chief Minister KC Rao. This was after the Chief Minister had reportedly commented that if journalists were to insult Telangana culture or fail to salute the Telangana people, then he would "break the necks and bury underground media persons." The committee heard evidence from over a hundred people, mostly journalists, in this connection. In October 2014, the committee confirmed that the Chief Minister had made the comments in its findings of fact and directed the Chief Minister to exercise restraint and refrain from making provocative comments against journalists.

References

Indian columnists
Living people
Indian male journalists
Year of birth missing (living people)
Place of birth missing (living people)